Chung-guyŏk (Central Ward) is one of the 18 guyok which constitute the city of Pyongyang, North Korea. The district is located in the center of the city, between the Pothonggang Canal and Taedong River, and is bordered to the north by Moranbong-guyok, to the northwest by Potonggang-guyok, and to the south by Pyongchon-guyok.

Overview
As the centre of Pyongyang, the district holds many of the city's most important buildings. The famous Kim Il-sung Square is located along the banks of the Taedong river, together with the Grand People's Study House, which is the national library of North Korea. Chung-guyok was once the historical centre of Pyongyang, and was almost completely obliterated during the Korean War by American bombing. Vestiges of the old city can still be seen, and the district is home to several of North Korea's National Treasures, including the rebuilt Potong and Taedong Gates, the Pyongyang Bell, the Ryongwang Pavilion, and the Sungryong and Sungin Halls. Other buildings include the Koryo Hotel, Taedonggang Hotel, Pyongyang First Department Store, the Korea Stamp Museum, the Pyongyang Central Children's palace and Taedongmoon Cinema.

The Pyongyang Metro runs through this district, with stops at Yonggwang, Ponghwa and Sungri stations. Pyongyang's central railway station is also located here.

Executive offices of the North Korean government and its industry are located in the area. The headquarters of the Workers' Party of Korea and the headquarters of the Central Committee of the Workers' Party of Korea are located in the area.

Many new riverside terraced apartments were built along the Pothonggang Canal, a project which Kim Jong-un visited multiple times, and the district was renamed by the 690th order of the Presidium of the SPA.

Economy
Air Koryo has a booking office in Tongsŏng-dong.

Administrative divisions
Chung-guyok is divided into nineteen administrative districts known as dong.

References

Districts of Pyongyang